An Antarctic Specially Protected Area (ASPA) is an area on the continent of Antarctica, or on nearby islands, which is protected by scientists and several different international bodies. The protected areas were established in 1961 under the Antarctic Treaty System, which governs all the land and water south of 60 latitude and protects against human development. A permit is required for entry into any ASPA site. The ASPA sites are protected by the governments of Australia, New Zealand, United States, United Kingdom, Chile, France, Argentina, Poland, Russia, Norway, Japan, India, Italy, and Republic of Korea. There are currently 72 sites.

List of ASPA sites

|}

See also
Antarctic Specially Managed Area

References

External links
Official List of ASPA sites
ats.aq: The Official Guide to the Preparation of Management Plans for Antarctic Specially Protected Areas
Government of Japan - efforts to protect Antarctica in Japan
US State Department - Proposed Re-numbering of Antarctic Specially Protected Areas

Antarctica agreements
1961 in Antarctica